Alone on a Wide, Wide Sea is a book by Michael Morpurgo, first published in 2006 by HarperCollins. It was inspired by the history of English orphans transported to Australia after World War II. The book's title is taken from a line in The Rime of the Ancient Mariner.

The book was a Carnegie Medal Nominee in 2008.

In 2017, the book was adapted into an audio play that was read in four half-hour parts and broadcast on BBC Radio 2, featuring Morpurgo and starring Jason Donovan, as well as original music from some of Britain's best folk singers including Julie Matthews and Chris While, Boo Hewerdine and Jez Lowe.

Part One (Arthur Hobhouse)
Arthur Hobhouse tells the story of his life. His earliest memory was that he was an orphan from Bermondsey, in London, and that, at the age of five, in 1947, he was transported to Australia to find a new home. He is parted from his sister, Kitty upon being there. He later gets separated from his sister. He distinctly remembers the time of their parting, which was at their orphanage, when she gave him a key to hold onto and told him to never lose it. He treasures the key from then on, despite not knowing what it is for. He boards the ship and leaves with other orphans for Australia.

The voyage is long and terrible for Arthur. In his bunk, there are other boys from the North who are older than he is. They bully him due to his age, his accent, his habit of humming London Bridge is Falling Down to get himself to sleep, and for his wicked sea sickness. But one day, whilst being sick over the ship's railing again, he meets fellow London orphan Marty. They become best friends, and Marty stands up to the boys bullying Arthur by punching their leader, Wes Snarkey. They never bully Arthur again after this.

Upon arrival in Sydney, an officer tries to separate Arthur and Marty, but Marty is persistent that they stay together, and the two, along with the remaining boys, are taken on a bus ride through the outback. Arthur notices that only one of the boys from his cabin is on the bus, Wes. Marty talks about how brilliant their new life will be, while Arthur reckons his lucky key is being lucky for him.

The bus draws to a halt at a farm called Cooper's Station. A gramophone is playing What a Friend We Have in Jesus. The farm is run by Mr. Bacon (known to the boys as Piggy Bacon), and his wife, Mrs. Ida Bacon (known as Mrs. Piggy). The couple are very unalike. Piggy Bacon is cruel, loud, and claims to be a devout Christian but is not; Mrs. Piggy is kind, caring, quiet, a good Christian, and completely under her husband's power.

Soon, Mrs. Piggy's kindness is revealed, and the boys start calling her by her name, Ida. Ida attempts to burn the farmhouse down to free the children from the working camp, but fails. Wes, now the boys' heroes because of his blatant defiance, attempts to escape on a horse called Black Jack, but is brought back dead by the bushmen. Arthur and Marty later escape on Black Jack into the bush, where the bushmen look after them. One day the bushmen leave them for no apparent reason. It turned out that the bushmen had left them on the doorstep of Aunty Megs, a woman who looks after the orphaned animals of the bush, taking them in like they were her own children.

One day, she is badly injured after falling off her horse whilst riding in the outback. Soon after nursing her back to health, Arthur and Marty are sent as apprentices to a boat building firm in Sydney by Aunty Megs. Everything is well for a few years, until the boat yard's owner, heavily in debt, burns his business down to collect insurance, and is sent to prison. Unemployed and broke, Marty resorts to drinking. Eventually, Marty drowned after falling in the harbour after a night out.

Arthur returns to Aunty Megs for a few years, until her death. Her estranged son sells her house, so Arthur moves out and finds a job as a fisherman. He stays for a couple of years until one night while in a fishing boat he gets thoughts of a fish suffering. He then quits fishing and joins the Navy to earn money, be at sea, and not fish anymore. Being deeply scarred by the war, Arthur then joins a trawling company. He falls into a stupor for fifteen years of losing job after job, gambling away whatever he earned, and drinking. One day, he wakes up in a hospital in Tasmania, having accidentally taking a lot of pills with whiskey. He falls in love with his nurse, Zita, and when he recovers, her father, the Cretan owner of Stavros Boats, gives him permission to marry her. They have a daughter called Alexis, nicknamed Allie by Arthur.

When Allie is ten years old, she makes Arthur promise that they'll sail to England to find Kitty. Zita agrees, but only when Allie turns eighteen. This inspires Arthur to make a bath toy boat for Allie, called the Kitty. The idea evolves through three more stages; the Kitty II, a pond boat; the Kitty III, a bigger boat for Allie to sail in river races; and finally, when Allie turns eighteen, the Kitty IV, in which they planned to sail to England in. Unfortunately, after the boat's launch, Arthur collapses, and is diagnosed with a terminal brain tumor. He finishes telling his story to Allie, who types it up, and the first part of the book ends days before his death.

Part Two (Allie)
After her father's death, Allie sails alone from Australia to England.

En route to New Zealand, the Kitty IV is joined by an albatross. Allie becomes convinced that the spirit of her father lives on in the albatross, and the bird becomes an important source of motivation. Sadly, after rounding Cape Horn, she accidentally kills the albatross, as it gets fouled in a fishing line that she is trailing behind the boat. This loss triggers her to fall into a depressive mood, which eventually is lifted when she encounters a loggerhead turtle.

She attracts the attention of Marc Topolski, an American astronaut on board the International Space Station (ISS). They strike up a friendship via phone and email, as the ISS frequently passes overhead Kitty IV. Then with the help of her mother, grandfather and the astronaut she finds Kitty. When Allie meets Kitty, Kitty tells her how she was adopted by a Canadian family and grew up with them in Canada. Kitty then produces a box and Allie, who still has her father's lucky key, gives Kitty the key who inserts it into the box. The box is a musical box. It plays London Bridge is Falling Down, Allie's father's favourite song. Allie then proceeds to read Kitty her father's story.

Reception

References

External links
HarperCollins website on Michael Morpurgo
Michael Morpurgo website
Page of the book

2006 British novels
British children's novels
Novels by Michael Morpurgo
Novels set in Australia
Fiction set in 1947
HarperCollins books
Novels about orphans
2006 children's books
British children's books